Lisica ("fox" in several Slavic languages) may refer to:

 LiSiCA (Ligand Similarity using Clique Algorithm), software used in molecular modelling
 Lisica (Gostynin), a village in Poland

People with the surname
 Slavko Lisica (1944-2013), Serbian Major general
 Mileta Lisica (1966-2020), Serbian-Slovenian basketball player
 Rade Lisica (born 1997), Slovenian basketball player
 Mateo Lisica (born 2003), Croatian football player

See also
 Gollak-Lisica, a peak in the Gollak, Kosovo
 Lesica (disambiguation)
 Lisca
 Lisitsa (disambiguation)

Surnames from nicknames